Landsmann is a surname. Notable people with the surname include:

 Kerstin Landsmann (born 1977), German actress and stuntwoman
 Maik Landsmann (born 1967), East German track cyclist